Meik Karwot (born 27 February 1993) is a German professional footballer who plays as a defensive midfielder for Polish club Zagłębie Sosnowiec.

Career
Karwot was born in Würselen, Germany. After failing to make an appearance for German Bundesliga side Hannover 96, he signed for Fostiras in the Greek second division. However, he soon left due to financial issues and returned to Germany, where he played for fourth division clubs SVN Zweibrücken, as well as Wormatia Worms.

For the second half of the 2016–17 season, Karwot joined Górnik Zabrze, helping them achieve promotion to Ekstraklasa but suffering an injury in the process.

In 2018, he signed for another Polish second division team, Radomiak Radom.

After leaving Radomiak at the end of the 2022–23 season, Karwot remained a free agent until 9 January 2023, when he signed with Zagłębie Sosnowiec until the end of June 2024.

Honours
Radomiak Radom
I liga: 2020–21
II liga: 2018–19

References

External links

1993 births
Living people
People from Würselen
Sportspeople from Cologne (region)
German footballers
Footballers from North Rhine-Westphalia
Association football defenders
Association football midfielders
Regionalliga players
Ekstraklasa players
I liga players
II liga players
Fostiras F.C. players
SVN Zweibrücken players
Wormatia Worms players
Lüneburger SK Hansa players
Górnik Zabrze players
MKP Pogoń Siedlce players
Radomiak Radom players
Zagłębie Sosnowiec players
German expatriate footballers
German expatriate sportspeople in Poland
Expatriate footballers in Poland